The 2011–12 Swiss Cup was the 87th season of Switzerland's annual football cup competition. It began on 16 September 2011 with the first games of Round 1 and ended on 16 May 2012 with the Final in the Stade de Suisse in Berne. The winners of the competition, Basel, qualified for the play-off round of the 2012–13 UEFA Europa League as per the benefits of winning. The former title holders are FC Sion.

Participating clubs
All ten Super League teams and fifteen Challenge League clubs (FC Vaduz are from Liechtenstein and thus play in the 2011–12 Liechtenstein Cup) entered the 2011-2011 competition, as well as 13 teams from 1. Liga and 26 teams from lower leagues. Teams from 1. Liga and below had to qualify through separate qualifying rounds within their leagues.

Round 1
Teams from Super League and Challenge League were seeded in this round. In a match, the home advantage was granted to the team from the lower league, if applicable. The games were played on 16, 17 and 18 September 2011.

|colspan="3" style="background-color:#99CCCC"|16 September 2011

|-
|colspan="3" style="background-color:#99CCCC"|17 September 2011

|-
|colspan="3" style="background-color:#99CCCC"|18 September 2011

|}

Round 2
The winners of Round 1 played in this round. Teams from Super League were seeded, the home advantage was granted to the team from the lower league, if applicable. The games were played on 15 and 16 October 2011.

|colspan="3" style="background-color:#99CCCC"|15 October 2011

|-
|colspan="3" style="background-color:#99CCCC"|16 October 2011

|}

Round 3
The winners of Round 2 played in this round, the home advantage was granted to the team from the lower league, if applicable. The games were played on 26–27 November 2011.

|colspan="3" style="background-color:#99CCCC"|26 November 2011

|-
|colspan="3" style="background-color:#99CCCC"|27 November 2011

|}

Quarter-finals
The winners of Round 3 play in the Quarterfinals, there is no home advantage granted in the draw. The games will be played on the 20 and 21 March 2012.

Semi-finals 
The winners of Quarterfinals play in the Semifinals, there is no home advantage granted in the draw. The games were played on the 11 and 15 April 2012.

Final
The Final was played between the two Semifinal winners and took place at Stade de Suisse in Berne.

References

External links
 Official site 

Swiss Cup seasons
Swiss Cup
Cup